Oatfield was a chocolate and confectionery manufacturer located in Letterkenny, County Donegal, Ireland. The company was the oldest confectionery manufacturer in Ireland.

History

Early years

The business began as a wholesale and retail outlet on the Port Road in the town. The McKinney family began to make their own sweets, and on 15 August 1927, the first sweets were made on an open coke fire in a shed at the back of the shop. The land on which the factory stood was purchased in November 1929, the first sod was cut in February 1930. Six people were employed at the time.

The company at the time was known as Mayfield Confectionery but the name was changed soon afterwards as another company in Manchester traded by this name. The company name was changed to Oatfield. The land on which the factory was built was known as Oatfield. The May was dropped and Oat was substituted and hence the name "Oatfield". The weekly production of confectionery was about 3 tons. Today the company produces approximately 65 tons a week.

Sugar was purchased in the 1930s from Tate & Lyle. Glucose came from Manchester. They were delivered by ship and rail via Derry to Letterkenny railway station. Later, glucose was shipped from the Netherlands to the Letterkenny Port. In later years, only Irish sugar and Irish glucose were used. Butter had always been Irish Creamery Butter.

Recent years
By 1960 Oatfield decided to stop marketing packed sweets made by Cadbury's, Rowntree, Urney's Chocolates, Bassetts Licorice Allsorts, Jacobs Biscuits, William and Wood, Ritchies Mints and Milroy Confectionery and focus entirely on selling Oatfield sweets. This was a major decision and proved a major success for the company. Exporting began in August 1964. The first sweets were exported to Northern Ireland. At the peak of the company's popularity, the sweets were exported worldwide to countries including the United States, Canada, Hong Kong, Australia, Kuwait, Greece and France.

Today
Donegal Creameries PLC purchased the company in February 1999 for £783,750. In 2007, Zed Candy—an Irish confectionery company famous for its Chewing Gum—bought the brand from Donegal Creameries.

Up until closure, the factory employed approximately 15 people and up to 65 tonnes of sugar and chocolate confectionery were produced each week. The main production lines were Emerald, Toffees, Eclairs, Boiled sweets. The biggest sellers were Emerald, Colleen Assortment and Orange Chocolate.

The factory was closed by the current operators, Zed Candy, on 27 May 2012. Production was soon after moved to the UK. In May 2014 the factory was demolished.

Products
Oatfield Emerald
Oatfield Eskimo Mints
Oatfield Clove Drops
Oatfield Eclairs
Oatfield Glucose Barley
Oatfield Glucose Fruits
Oatfield Irish Butter Toffee
Oatfield Liquorice Toffee
Oatfield Mint Humbugs
Oatfield Orange Chocolate

References

 
Brand name confectionery
Food companies of the Republic of Ireland
Organisations based in Letterkenny